Corythodinium elegans is a species of dinoflagellates in the family Oxytoxaceae. It is found Worldwide. The type locality is the  Mediterranean. It is also found in Australian and New Zealand waters.

References

External links 

 
 Corythodinium elegans at AlgaeBase
 Corythodinium elegans at the Atlas of Living Australia

Dinophyceae
Species described in 1976